Samaritan Aramaic, or Samaritan, was the dialect of Aramaic used by the Samaritans in their sacred and scholarly literature.  This should not be confused with the Samaritan Hebrew language of the Scriptures. Samaritan Aramaic ceased to be a spoken language some time between the 10th and the 12th centuries, with Samaritans switching to Palestinian Arabic as their vernacular language.

In form it resembles the Aramaic of the Targumim, and is written in the Samaritan alphabet.

Important works written in Samaritan include the translation of the Samaritan Pentateuch in the form of the targum paraphrased version.  There are also legal, exegetical and liturgical texts, though later works of the same kind were often written in Arabic.

Sample

Exodus XX.1-6:

 
 
 
 
 
 

Notice the similarities with Judeo-Aramaic as found in Targum Onqelos to this same passage (some expressions below are paraphrased, not literally translated):

 Umalleil Adonai yat kol pitgamayya ha'illein lemeimar
 Ana Adonai elahach de'appeiktach me'ar'a deMiṣrayim mibbeit avduta
 La yihvei lach elah achoran, bar minni
 La ta'aveid lach ṣeilam vechol demu devišmayya mille'eila vediv'ar'a millera vedivmayya millera le'ar'a
 La tisgod lehon vela tiflechinnin arei ana adonai elahach el kanna mas'ar chovei avahan al benin maradin al dar telitai ve'al dar revi'ai lesane'ai kad mašlemin benayya lemichtei batar avahatehon
 Ve'aveid teivu le'alfei darin lerachamai ulenaterei pikkodai

See also

 Christian Palestinian Aramaic
 Jewish Babylonian Aramaic
 Jewish Palestinian Aramaic
 Mandaic language
 Western Neo-Aramaic

Bibliography

J. Rosenberg, A. Hartleben's Verlag: Wien, Pest, Leipzig.
Nicholls, G. F. A Grammar of the Samaritan Language with Extracts and Vocabulary. London: Samuel Bagster and Sons, 1858.
Tal, Abraham, A Dictionary of Samaritan Aramaic: Brill 2000

External links
 Samaritan Aramaic Targum - Aramaic text of Samaritan Targum with English translation. 
  -https://www.the-samaritans.net - The Samaritan prayers services and liturgy.

References

Samaritan culture and history
Aramaic languages
Extinct languages
Extinct languages of Asia
Languages of the State of Palestine
Western Aramaic languages